Protochauliodes spenceri is a species of fishfly in the family Corydalidae. It is found in North America.

References

Further reading

 

Corydalidae
Articles created by Qbugbot
Insects described in 1951